Alice Flora Kameni Djientieu (born 13 November 2001), known as Flora Kameni, is a Cameroonian footballer who plays as a forward for Louves Minproff and the Cameroon women's national team.

Club career
Kameni has played for Louves Minproff in Cameroon.

International career
Kameni has won the silver medal at the 2019 African Games with the Cameroon women's national under-20 team. She capped at senior level during the 2020 CAF Women's Olympic Qualifying Tournament.

References

2001 births
Living people
Cameroonian women's footballers
Women's association football forwards
Competitors at the 2019 African Games
African Games silver medalists for Cameroon
Cameroon women's international footballers
African Games medalists in football
21st-century Cameroonian women